The 2010–11 Plunket Shield season was the 85th season of official first-class domestic cricket in New Zealand. The season began on 10 November 2010.

Table

The Plunket Shield will be decided on points at the end of the 10 rounds.

Teams

Statistics

Most Runs

Most Wickets

See also

Plunket Shield
New Zealand limited-overs cricket trophy
State Twenty20
2010–11 New Zealand one-day cricket competition season
2010–11 HRV Cup

Plunket Shield
Plunket Shield
1